Catalino Rivarola Méndez (born 30 April 1965 in Zabalhos, Asunción) is a former football defender from Paraguay.

Club
Rivarola started his club career with Cerro Porteño in 1985 and was part of the team that won the 1987 championship. In 1991, he joined Talleres de Córdoba in Argentina.

In 1995, he moved to Brazil where he was part of the Grêmio team that won several titles including the Recopa Sudamericana in 1995, in 1999 he played for Palmeiras in the season that they won the Copa Libertadores. He spent 2000 with América-RJ before returning to Paraguay in 2001 to play for Libertad.

International 
Rivarola made his international debut for the Paraguay national football team on 7 September 1988 in a friendly match against Ecuador (5-1 win). He was capped 52 times and scored 3 goals for Paraguay in a national career which lasted from 1988 to 1998. Rivarola played at the 1998 FIFA World Cup and at the Copa América in 1989 and 1991.

Honours

Club
 Cerro Porteño
 Paraguayan Primera División: 1987
 Grêmio
 Copa Libertadores: 1995
 Campeonato Gaúcho: 1996
 Campeonato Brasileiro: 1996
 Recopa Sudamericana: 1996
 Copa do Brasil: 1997
 Palmeiras
 Copa Libertadores: 1999

References

External links

1965 births
Living people
Paraguayan footballers
Cerro Porteño players
Talleres de Córdoba footballers
Expatriate footballers in Argentina
Expatriate footballers in Brazil
Grêmio Foot-Ball Porto Alegrense players
Sociedade Esportiva Palmeiras players
America Football Club (RJ) players
Club Libertad footballers
Paraguayan Primera División players
Campeonato Brasileiro Série A players
Paraguay international footballers
1998 FIFA World Cup players
Paraguayan expatriate footballers
1989 Copa América players
1991 Copa América players
Association football defenders